Apart Together is a 2010 Chinese drama film directed by Wang Quan'an. It was nominated for the Golden Bear at the 60th Berlin International Film Festival and won the Best Screenplay award.

Plot
A former Nationalist soldier (Feng Ling) who fled mainland China in 1949 returns home to his family years later. But his wife (Lu Yan) has a new common-law husband and he has never met his son before.

Cast
 Lu Yan as Qiao Yu-e
 Xu Caigen as Qiao Yu-e's husband 
 Mo Xiaotian
 Ling Feng as Liu Yangsheng

Accolades

References

External links

 
 

2010 films
2010 drama films
Chinese drama films
Chinese-language films
Films directed by Wang Quan'an
Films set in Shanghai